Scosthrop is a civil parish in the Craven district of North Yorkshire, England. The population as taken at the 2011 Census was less than 100. Details are included in the civil parish of Kirkby Malham.

The Meaning of Liff defines Scosthrop as "(vb): to make vague opening or cutting movements with the hands when wandering about looking for a tin opener, scissors, etc., in the hope that this will help in some way."

Civil parishes in North Yorkshire